The Mark (Dutch) or Marcq (French) is a river in Belgium, right tributary of the Dender. It passes through the homonymous village Marcq, Enghien, Herne, Tollembeek, Galmaarden, Vollezele, Bever, Moerbeke and Viane. The Mark flows into the Dender in Deux-Acres, between Lessines and Geraardsbergen. The Dender is a tributary of the Scheldt.

Rivers of Belgium
Rivers of Flemish Brabant
Rivers of Hainaut (province)
Enghien